Albert Edward Derrick (8 September 1908 – 5 June 1975) was a Welsh professional footballer who made 125 appearances as a forward in the Football League for Newport County. He is a member of the club's Hall of Fame.

Personal life 
Derrick was the father of Albert Derrick Jr, who also played football for Newport County.

Career statistics

Honours 
Newport County
 Football League Third Division South: 1938–39
Individual

 Newport County Hall of Fame

References 

1908 births
1975 deaths
Footballers from Newport, Wales
Welsh footballers
Association football forwards
Newport County A.F.C. players
Swindon Town F.C. players
Ebbw Vale F.C. players
English Football League players
Association football outside forwards
Aberaman Athletic F.C. players
Crewe Alexandra F.C. wartime guest players
Chester City F.C. wartime guest players
Wrexham F.C. wartime guest players